Bijlipur is a small village and a notified area in Berma Panchayat, Kachua post, Madhepur thana  in the Madhubani district in the Indian state of Bihar.

Geography 
Bijlipur  located at  26.27°N 86.28°E. It has an average elevation of 59 metres (193 feet).
Bijlipur  is a small village located near the Tamoria Railway station, Deep Halt and Jhanjharpur City. In the British time this village name was Laxmipur. This village is surrounded by many roads to protect from flood. If the flood water came in the village that means all near village & city totally dipped with flood water.

Demographics
This is a small village with different community of people living here. Main communities are Barai, Yadav, Taili, Kanwar.

Economy

Agriculture
The main crops grown in this area are paddy rice, wheat, rice, paan, peas, makhana, mango, green vegetables, bamboos and sugar cane.

Markets
There are three important business hubs of the village Deep Halt market, Jhanjharpur market and Madhepur market.

Tourist attractions
Jattu Thakur Ji Gaon Dihwar Sthan
Barre Sthan
Garhiya Kalam
Prachin Shiv temple Brari Tolla.

References

External links
http://www.wikimapia.org/14178887/BijliPur

Villages in Madhubani district